This article lists various economic and human development measurements related to the study of globalization.

 The Atlas of Economic Complexity
 Big Mac Index 
 Brandt Report
 Corruption Perceptions Index
 Democracy Index
 Democracy-Dictatorship Index
 Ease of doing business index
 Economic Freedom of the World
 Economic Vulnerability Index
 Energy Globalization Index
 Environmental Performance Index
 Environmental Vulnerability Index
 Freedom in the World
 Gini coefficient
 Global city
 Global Competitiveness Report
 Global Connectedness Index
 Global Enabling Trade Report
 Global Entrepreneurship Index
 Global Food Security Index
 Global Gender Gap Report
 Global Hunger Index
 Global Innovation Index
 Global Liveability Ranking
 Global Peace Index
 Global Slavery Index
 Global Terrorism Index
 Global Web Index
 Good Country Index
 Government competitiveness
 Happy Planet Index
 Human Development Index
 Human Poverty Index
 Index of Economic Freedom
 Internationalization Index
 KOF Index of Globalisation
 Linguistic Diversity Index
 Maastricht Globalization Index
 Networked Readiness Index
 OECD Better Life Index
 Press Freedom Index
 Small Arms Survey
 Social Progress Index
 Trade-to-GDP ratio
 Transnationality Index
 World Competitiveness Yearbook
 World Intellectual Property Indicators
 World Giving Index
 World Governance Index
 World Happiness Report
 Where-to-be-born Index
 World Tourism rankings
 Worldwide Governance Indicators

See also
List of international rankings

References

Energy Globalisation Index: 

Indices
Index numbers